"Keep It Comin' (Dance Till You Can't Dance No More)" is a song by American musical group C+C Music Factory featuring vocals by Q-Unique and Deborah Cooper. In the US, the single went to number one on the Billboard Hot Dance Club Play chart. It is featured in the film, Buffy the Vampire Slayer, and its accompanying soundtrack.

Critical reception
Larry Flick from Billboard wrote that the song "is a direct descendent of "Gonna Make You Sweat", stating that "this pleasing track has all of the rousing gospel elements required to fill dancefloors". He added that "this jam is etched with more of a streetwise vibe. Rapper Q-Unique runs lyrical rings around the now-departed Freedom Williams, and Deborah Cooper proves to be a well-seasoned belter." John Martinucci from the Gavin Report commented, "Though the Music Factory has had personnel changes, the technical aspects of the group don't miss a beat. Rapper Q-Unique and vocalist Deborah Cooper sound comfortable in their new surroundings".

Track listings
 US 12-inch vinyl
A1. "Keep It Comin' (Dance Till You Can't Dance No More)" (C&C club mix)
A2. "Keep It Comin' (Dance Till You Can't Dance No More)" (Straight Outta Da Bronx mix)
B1. "Keep It Comin' (Dance Till You Can't Dance No More)" (The Cole & Clivilles house anthem)
B2. "Keep It Comin' (Dance Till You Can't Dance No More)" (A Capella Pieces)

 CD single
 "Keep It Comin' (Dance Till You Can't Dance No More)" (pop radio mix)
 "Keep It Comin' (Dance Till You Can't Dance No More)" (radio mix)
 "Keep It Comin' (Dance Till You Can't Dance No More)" (extended mix)

Charts

Release history

References

1992 singles
1992 songs
C+C Music Factory songs
Columbia Records singles
Song recordings produced by Robert Clivillés
Songs written by David Cole (record producer)
Songs written by Robert Clivillés
Songs written for films